Ivan Mikloš (born 2 June 1960) is a Slovak politician and the former Minister of Finance of Slovakia (2010–2012). He previously served as Slovakia's Minister of Finance from 2002 to 2006, and Deputy Prime Minister for Economy between 1998 and 2002.

In 2004, he was named the top business reformer by the World Bank's Doing Business report. Under his leadership, Slovakia jumped to 32nd place (of 178 economies) on the ease of doing business index. He is also known for attending the annual meeting of the Bilderberg Group in 2005.

Personal life

Mikloš was born in Svidník. He is married and has two children.

Professional biography
 1979–1983—study at Faculty of National Economics of College of Economics in Bratislava, focused on long-term planning and prognostic
 1983–1987—Assistant, College of Economics in Bratislava
 1987–1990—Research assistant, College of Economics in Bratislava
 1990—Advisor to the deputy prime minister of the Slovak Republic, responsible for economical reforms
 1990–1991—Director, Department of Economic and Social Policy, Office of the Government of the Slovak Republic
 1992–1998—Executive director and president of M.E.S.A.10 organization
 1993—study at London School of Economics, London, United Kingdom
 1994–1998—Lecturer, University of Trnava
 1997–1998—Member of supervisory board of National Property Fund of the Slovak Republic
 1998—designated first vice president, EastWest Institute, New York City

Political career
 1991–1992—Minister of Privatization of the Czech and Slovak Federative Republic
 1998–2002—Deputy Prime Minister for Economic Affairs of Slovakia
 2002–2006—Deputy Prime Minister and Minister of Finance of Slovakia
 2006–2010—Member of the National Council of Slovakia
 2010–2012—Minister of Finance of Slovakia
 2015—Consultant of Ukrainian finance and economy ministers

Political party membership
 1992–1993—Public Against Violence, deputy chairman
 1993–2000—Democratic Party, chairman in 1994
 2001–present—Slovak Democratic and Christian Union, deputy chairman

See also
 Tatra Tiger

References

External links
 Ivan Mikloš' page at government's website

Sources
 http://www.doingbusiness.org
 http://www.oecd.org/speaker/0,3438,en_21571361_22024020_27546494_1_1_1_1,00.html
 http://www.sdkuonline.sk/english/repre.shtml
 http://www.government.gov.sk/english/minister_mf.html (government website about current minister of finance, archived version here )

|-

1960 births
Living people
People from Svidník
Rusyn people
Public Against Violence politicians
Democratic Party (Slovakia, 1989) politicians
Slovak Democratic and Christian Union – Democratic Party politicians
Finance ministers of Slovakia
University of Economics in Bratislava alumni
Alumni of the London School of Economics
Members of the National Council (Slovakia) 2006-2010